The Seer is the third studio album by the Scottish band Big Country, released in 1986. The album featured very traditional Scottish musical settings, reminiscent of the band's debut album The Crossing (1983). Kate Bush worked on the title song in a duet with lead singer and lyricist Stuart Adamson. The album's first single, "Look Away", was an Irish number one, and was also the group's biggest hit single in the UK, reaching #7.

The album reached number 2 in the UK Albums Chart.

Lyrics and music
The Seer saw Big Country return to the sweeping Scottish sound that had made them famous on The Crossing. It is sometimes considered to be the band's most overtly Celtic album, with many of the songs containing explicit or veiled references to Scottish history - for example, "Remembrance Day" deals with the Highland Clearances (in which thousands of Highlanders were relocated to British colonial possessions such as Canada and New Zealand), "Red Fox" is about the 1752 Appin Murder, and the title track concerns the seventeenth century mystic the Brahan Seer.

Mixes
The album was given two separate mixes. The first was done by producer Robin Millar with the input of the band. This mix was rejected by the band's record label for being not commercial enough, and Walter Turbitt was brought in to remix the album. Turbitt's mix, which was eventually released, was disliked by the band, as it had more overtly poppy elements (such as added reverberation) in contrast to Millar's drier, crisper mix. The original mix remains unreleased, with the exception of "Look Away," the single version of which was released before the remix had been completed.

Reception
Critic Anthony DeCurtis of Rolling Stone gave The Seer a positive review, calling it "possibly [the band's] strongest effort to date":

Track listing
All songs written by Stuart Adamson, except where noted. † Written by Adamson/Watson. †† Written by Adamson/Butler.
"Look Away" – 4:23
"The Seer" (featuring Kate Bush) † – 5:26
"The Teacher" – 4:05
"I Walk the Hill" †† – 3:30
"Eiledon" - 5:35
"One Great Thing" †† - 4:00
"Hold the Heart" - 6:04
"Remembrance Day" - 4:28
"The Red Fox" - 4:09
"Sailor" - 4:52
"Song of the South" (Re-Issue Bonus)
"Look Away" [12" Mix] (Re-Issue Bonus)
"One Great Thing" [Disco Mix] (Re-Issue Bonus)
"Giant" (Re-Issue Bonus)

Charts

Weekly charts

Year-end charts

Personnel
Big Country
Stuart Adamson - guitar, vocals
Mark Brzezicki - drums, percussion, vocals
Tony Butler - bass, steel guitar, vocals
Bruce Watson - guitar, mandolin, sitar

Additional personnel
Kate Bush - backing vocals on "The Seer"
June Miles-Kingston - backing vocals on "Eiledon" and "Remembrance Day"
Davie Duncan - bodhran

References

Big Country albums
1986 albums
Mercury Records albums
Albums produced by Robin Millar